Helianthus schweinitzii is a perennial wildflower endemic to the Piedmont physiographic province of North Carolina and South Carolina.  Its common name is Schweinitz's sunflower. It is a member of the sunflower family (Asteraceae). It is one of the rarest species of sunflower in the United States. It is common along utility and highway rights-of-way in North Carolina and South Carolina. There are only about 90 known populations, many containing less than 40 plants each. The U.S. Fish and Wildlife Service listed Schweinitz's sunflower as an endangered species on May 7, 1991.

History
Botanists John Torrey (1796-1873) and Asa Gray (1810-1888) first mentioned the species in 1842. It is named for Lewis David von Schweinitz (1780-1834), a Salem, North Carolina  clergyman and botanist who discovered the species.

Description
Schweinitz's sunflower grows from 3 to 13 feet (1 to 4 meters) tall. It usually grows to about 6.5 feet and sometimes reaching heights of 16 feet. The sunflower produces tubers and rhizomes underground. Its stems are purple and usually solitary, branching only at or above mid-stem. Its leaves are thick and stiff, tending to droop towards the end. The sunflower is perennial, and flowers for about two to three weeks in early October.

Schweinitz's sunflower spreads through dispersal of seeds without a dormant period. One plant generally produces 3-6 yellow flower heads. Each head has 8-15 disc florets surrounding 40 or more disc florets.

Habitat
Schweinitz's sunflower is only found in the Piedmont region of North and South Carolina. The sunflower is generally found growing on shallow, poor, clayey, and/or rocky soils.[5] The flower grows best in full to partial sun. Most populations grow near power line right-of-ways or roadsides. In 2003, 80% of the known populations were found near railways, utility roads, and roadsides. 13 known populations exist in North Carolina today.

Conservation
The U.S. Fish and Wildlife Service listed Schweinitz's sunflower as “Endangered” May 7, 1999. The sunflower does not have a designated critical habitat. It is eligible for relisting as “Threatened” under certain circumstances. It met none of the "Threatened" criteria during its 5-year evaluation. It did not meet the “10 geographically distinct, self-sustaining populations are protected in at least 4 counties in North Carolina and one in South Carolina” criteria. Fish and Wildlife Services also failed to choose managers for each population, and design and put in place management plans. Populations were not maintained for 5 years. De-listing has not been discussed, since the requirements are stricter. The sunflower also did not meet "Threatened" criteria within 5 years.  Instead of being reclassified, the sunflower was given a new priority number. This new number corresponds to a high level of threat, as well as a high recovery potential and a potential for economic conflict.

Currently all populations are monitored. Methods of monitoring vary, but no population displayed a steady increase. The number of individuals has increased. The increase is different by population and location, so it does not meet criteria.

Since this flower occurs in rapidly-developing areas, some of its greatest threats are human impact. Some threats include: construction and utility workers, industrial developments, and construction improvements. Fire suppression also contributes to loss of population.

The Endangered Species Act of 1973 protects the sunflower and other wildflower habitats. The North Carolina Plant Protection Act also protects wildflowers. It limits commercial trade and collection of these flowers without a license. In South Carolina, the state code prohibits “gathering, damaging, or destroying” of all plants on the owned by the state's Department of Natural Resources.

There is currently no International Union for Conservation of Nature (IUCN) listing for Schweinitz's sunflower.

References

External links
 Center for Plant Conservation Species Profile

schweinitzii
Flora of North Carolina
Flora of South Carolina
Plants described in 1842
Taxa named by Asa Gray
Taxa named by John Torrey